Bangabandhu International Conference Center formerly known as Bangladesh China Friendship Conference Center is the only international conference center of Bangladesh situated at Sher-e-Bangla, Dhaka. It was designed by Beijing Institute of Architectural Designs and Research.

It has seventeen venues for holding small to large scale events, state functions, social events, seminars, conferences, product launches, annual general meetings, fairs, exhibitions, cultural programs, reality shows, etc. BICC has hosted a number of international conferences and summits over the years including 13th SAARC summit.

Gallery

References

External links

 Official website
 Bangabandhu International Conference Center on Banglapedia

2001 establishments in Bangladesh
Convention centres in Bangladesh
Memorials to Sheikh Mujibur Rahman